Claude Sirvent (born in Foix, on 6 February 1971) is a French rugby league footballer who represented France at the 2000 World Cup.

Sirvent played in thirty two tests for France between 1992 and 2004 and also played for the Saint-Gaudens Bears, including in the 2002 Challenge Cup.

He made his first steps in rugby league in Vernajoul, which also produced names such as Jacques Moliner, Lilian Hébert and Christophe Moly.
Sirvent is considered as the "son of Ariège and of the town of Foix", a region where he hails from. He was capped 46 times and scored 64 points for France.

References

1971 births
Living people
French rugby league players
France national rugby league team players
Rugby league wingers
Rugby league centres
Saint-Gaudens Bears players